Palatine is a ghost town in Lookout Township, Ellis County, Kansas, United States.

History
Palatine was issued a post office in 1880. The post office was discontinued in 1897.

References

Further reading

External links
 Ellis County maps: Current, Historic, KDOT

Former populated places in Ellis County, Kansas
Former populated places in Kansas